The Pokémon Mystery Dungeon: Adventure Team series are three role-playing games released for WiiWare, part of the Pokémon Mystery Dungeon series of games. The titles, which were released in Japan on 4 August 2009, are Pokémon Mystery Dungeon: Advance! Fire Adventure Team, Pokémon Mystery Dungeon: Go! Storm Adventure Team and Pokémon Mystery Dungeon: Aim! Light Adventure Team. This installment is the first game in the Mystery Dungeon series to be on a home system, with the next home installment being Pokémon Mystery Dungeon: Rescue Team DX for the Nintendo Switch.

As with other installments in the Mystery Dungeon series, the game centers on randomly changing, multilevel dungeons which the player must explore and clear whilst battling hostile Pokémon in turn-based combat. It features separate Pokémon and dungeons between different versions, altogether containing 493 Pokémon of the first four generations of the Pokémon main series games.

Gameplay
While similar to previous installments such as the Rescue Team and Explorers titles, Adventure Team introduces 3-dimensional graphics instead of the sprite-based graphics of the aforementioned titles. Aside from a difference of starters and the game's hub location (in Fire Adventure Team, red-colored Pokémon such as Charmander are available in the "Pokémon Village", with blue-colored ones such as Squirtle in "Pokémon Beach" and yellow ones such as Pikachu in "Pokémon Garden" being available in Light Adventure Team and Storm Adventure Team, respectively), the three games each contain 15 "Mystery Dungeons" which are unique to each other. Unlike preceding handheld games, Adventure Team games allows 4 save files in a single game. In addition, the player is capable of switching their character at any point in the game to another from a roster of nine Pokémon. Transfer of befriended Pokémon or items between the aforementioned save slots are allowed. The Nintendo DS can also be used as a controller for the game.

The three games collectively features all 493 Pokémon of the fourth generation games, including Arceus which was available through a special distribution. They also enable online features such as the WiiConnect24 and the Nintendo Wi-Fi Connection, through them allowing players to access special challenges and obtain otherwise unavailable Pokémon. The ability to execute "team attacks", where members of the player's team simultaneously attack an enemy Pokémon, were first introduced in Adventure Team, and would feature in later Mystery Dungeon installments. In Adventure Team, the Pokémon do so by stacking on top of each other, forming a "Pokémon Tower". In addition, the game allows player or allied Pokémon to evolve within the dungeons.

Plot
Unlike previous and following Pokémon Mystery Dungeon games, the player does not act as a human transformed into a Pokémon and are instead Pokémon inhabitants of a town (Pokémon Village, Beach, or Garden depending on the game). After rescuing a Shuckle from a "mystery dungeon" in a tutorial mission with a single partner, the group of nine Pokémon forms an Adventure Team following the request of an elderly Slowking. After some time, in a mission the Pokémon obtain some chocolate which they hand to Shuckle, enticing jealousy across the town. To restore the town, the Adventure Team explore another dungeon and returns with cookies, successfully returning the town to its former peaceful state.

Following the incident, one of the Legendary Beasts (Raikou, Entei or Suicune) depending on the game approaches the player, offering to join the Adventure Team. Later, they encounter other legendary Pokémon which are available for recruitment into the Rescue Team, in addition to higher-difficulty dungeons.

Release
Adventure Team installments were first teased through promotional pamphlets in mid-2009, with a website containing gameplay screenshots and footage being opened on July. The games were released on 4 August 2009 in the Wii Shop Channel for 1,200 Nintendo Points. The games were given a CERO rating of "A" (for all ages). Kotaku listed the games as one of the best released through the WiiWare.

English fan translations of the three games would later be published on 28 April 2020, with translated titles of Tempest, Radiant, and Wildfire Adventure Squad.

Notes

References

External links
  

Role-playing video games
Chunsoft games
Japan-exclusive video games
Roguelike video games
Tactical role-playing video games
2009 video games
Video games developed in Japan
Video games with alternative versions
Video games using procedural generation
Wii games
Wii-only games
WiiWare games
Pokémon Mystery Dungeon
Games with Wii-DS connectivity
Delisted digital-only games